The Nanded-Waghala City Municipal Corporation is the municipal governing body of the city of Nanded in the Indian state of Maharashtra.  Municipal Corporation mechanism in India was introduced during British Rule with formation of municipal corporation in Madras (Chennai) in 1688, later followed by municipal corporations in Bombay (Mumbai) and Calcutta (Kolkata) by 1762. Sitamarhi Municipal Corporation is headed by Mayor of city and governed by Commissioner. The municipal corporation consists of democratically elected members, is headed by a mayor and the Municipal Commissioner is the CEO who administers the city's civic services, infrastructure.

List of Mayor

List of Deputy Mayor

List of Chairman, Standing Committee

History 
NWCMC was established on 26 March 1997, by merging Nanded Municipal Council and adjoining Waghala Municipal Council. The Corporation is constituted under the provisions of Bombay Provincial Municipal Corporations Act, 1949.
Corporation is governed by the provisions of 74th Constitutional Amendment Act, 1992.

Geographical Scope

Nanded City is divided in two parts i.e. Old Nanded (20.62 km2) situated north side of the Godavari river (on the left bank) and New Nanded (31.14 km2) comprising Waghala and six other newly merged villages and CIDCO area, compromising south of the Godavari River.
The total area under the NWCMC jurisdiction is 51.76 km2 i.e. (5,176.66 Ha).

In addition to the Waghala Municipal Council 5 more Villages viz. Vasarni Village, Kautha Village,  Asarjan Village, Fatehjangpur Village, Asadwan Village & CIDCO and HUDCO colonies were merged with the NWCMC.

Revenue sources 

The following are the Income sources for the Corporation from the Central and State Government.

Revenue from taxes 
Following is the Tax related revenue for the corporation.

 Property tax.
 Profession tax.
 Entertainment tax.
 Grants from Central and State Government like Goods and Services Tax.
 Advertisement tax.

Revenue from non-tax sources 

Following is the Non Tax related revenue for the corporation.

 Water usage charges.
 Fees from Documentation services.
 Rent received from municipal property.
 Funds from municipal bonds.

Administration 

The NWCMC is headed by an IAS officer who serves as Municipal Commissioner, wielding executive power. A quinquennial election is held to elect corporators, who are responsible for basic civic infrastructure and enforcing duty. The Mayor, usually from the majority party, serves as head of the house.

Mayor's of Nanded 

Office of NWCMC is located at Nanded which is situated on the banks of Godavari River.

Corporation Election 2017 
The Municipal corporation elections were held on. 11 October 2017 and the result was declared on 23 November 2017.

Political performance in Election 2017 
The results of Election 2017 are as follows.

References 

Municipal corporations in Maharashtra
Nanded
1997 establishments in Maharashtra